German submarine U-386 was a Type VIIC U-boat of Nazi Germany's Kriegsmarine during World War II.

She carried out four patrols. She sank one ship.

She was a member of five wolfpacks.

She was sunk by a British warship in mid-Atlantic on 19 February 1944.

Design
German Type VIIC submarines were preceded by the shorter Type VIIB submarines. U-386 had a displacement of  when at the surface and  while submerged. She had two shafts and two  propellers.

U-386 was fitted with five  torpedo tubes (four fitted at the bow and one at the stern), fourteen torpedoes, one  SK C/35 naval gun, 220 rounds, and two twin  C/30 anti-aircraft guns. The boat had a complement of between forty-four and sixty.

Service history
The submarine was laid down on 16 May 1941 at the Howaldtswerke yard at Kiel as yard number 17, launched on 19 August 1942 and commissioned on 10 October under the command of Oberleutnant zur See Hans-Albrecht Kandler.

She served with the 5th U-boat Flotilla from 10 October 1942 and the 6th flotilla from 1 May 1943 until her loss.

1st patrol
U-386s first patrol took her from Kiel in Germany to St. Nazaire in occupied France via the gap between Iceland and the Faroe Islands. She sank the Rosenborg which went down in 30 seconds. Two survivors were picked up.

The boat was attacked by the escorts of Convoy ON (S) 5 on 28 April 1943. Severe damage was caused.

2nd and 3rd patrols
The submarine's second sortie was relatively uneventful, but her third, which commenced on 29 August 1943, included a surprise attack by an unidentified aircraft off Cape Finisterre on 6 September. The boat was caught unaware due to the malfunctioning of the Wanze detector. Wanze means 'bug' in German.

She was also attacked by a British B-24 Liberator of No. 120 Squadron RAF on the 20th. The aircraft dropped a homing torpedo which caused no damage.

U-386 was forced into breaking off an attack a day later after being heavily depth charged.

4th patrol and loss

The boat had departed St. Nazaire on 26 December 1943. Exactly a month later (26 January 1944), she was off the west coast of Scotland, north of the island of Islay. She was sunk by depth charges dropped by the British frigate  on 19 February 1944.

Thirty-three men died from the U-boat; there were 16 survivors.

Wolfpacks
U-386 took part in five wolfpacks, namely:
 Star (27 – 30 April 1943) 
 Leuthen (15 – 21 September 1943) 
 Stürmer (26 January – 3 February 1944) 
 Igel 1 (3 – 17 February 1944) 
 Hai 1 (17 – 19 February 1944)

Summary of raiding history

References

Bibliography

External links

German Type VIIC submarines
U-boats commissioned in 1942
U-boats sunk in 1944
U-boats sunk by British warships
U-boats sunk by depth charges
1942 ships
Ships built in Kiel
World War II submarines of Germany
World War II shipwrecks in the Atlantic Ocean
Maritime incidents in February 1944